An OE Buoy or Ocean Energy Buoy is a wave power device that uses an Oscillating Water Column design. It was deployed in half-scale test mode in Spiddal near Galway in Ireland for over two years between 2007 and 2009. As of the 5th of March 2011 the model has been redeployed at the same site, primarily as a data collector for the EU funded Cores Project.

It was developed by the HMRC in Cork and is now owned and developed by the spun off Oceanenergy.

The OE Buoy is a version of a device known as the Backward Bent Duct Buoy (BBDB) which was invented in 1986 by wave energy pioneer and Japanese naval commander Yoshio Masuda.

External links 
"Ocean Energy signs turbine deal", 2010
"Ocean Energy in Ireland National Policies and Strategies for RD&D and Commercialisation of Ocean Energy" – pictures OE Buoy and Wavebob, both in situ on test site 2007 (pages 14–19)
Device in situ under test
Sunday Business Post, September 2009
Irish Times, March 2011
Cores Project March 2011

Renewable energy in the Republic of Ireland
Wave energy converters